John Phillips (16 September 1902 – 8 February 1967) was a Guyanese cricketer. He played in two first-class matches for British Guiana in 1922/23 and 1929/30.

See also
 List of Guyanese representative cricketers

References

External links
 

1902 births
1967 deaths
Guyanese cricketers
Guyana cricketers
Sportspeople from Georgetown, Guyana